Pizzo dei Tre Confini is a mountain of Lombardy, Italy. It is located within the Bergamo Alps.

Mountains of Lombardy
Mountains of the Alps